Astieridiscus is an extinct lower Cretaceous ammonite. Its shell evolute, covered by dense, simple or branching, slightly flexuous ribs. The sides are slightly flattened, the venter rounded. No umbilical or other tubercles except on innermost whorl. Superficially resembles Olcostephanus.

Notes

References
 
 
 

Cretaceous ammonites
Ammonites of Europe
Barremian life
Ammonitida genera
Desmoceratoidea